Love and Compromise (stylised as LOVE AND COMPROMISE) is the second studio album by Mahalia. It was released on 6 September 2019. It peaked at number 28 on the UK Albums Chart and number 3 on the UK R&B Albums Chart.

Critical reception

At Metacritic, which assigns a weighted average score out of 100 to reviews from mainstream critics, the album received an average score of 76, based on 6 reviews, indicating "generally favorable reviews".

Max Gayler of The Line of Best Fit described the album as "an outrageously consistent record full of sonic momentum and gripping lyricism." Andy Kellman of AllMusic wrote, "No matter how detailed the productions get, they don't obstruct the vocals, which are consistently dynamic without being showy."

Track listing

Charts

References

External links
 

2019 albums
Asylum Records albums
Contemporary R&B albums by English artists